Carex woodii, known as pretty sedge, is a species of sedge native to North America.

Description
Carex woodii is a rhizomatous sedge, forming loose clumps to large vegetative colonies. The leaf sheathes are tinged with reddish-purple. Compared to most other Carex across its range, it flowers and fruits earlier in the year. In Michigan it fruits by mid-May or earlier.

Distribution and habitat
Carex woodii is native to the Midwestern and Eastern United States and Ontario. It is found in both moist and dry woodlands. It is considered a rare plant of concern in the Chicago region and Connecticut.

References

woodii
Plants described in 1846
Flora of North America